Pterolophia zonata is a species of beetle in the family Cerambycidae. It was described by Henry Walter Bates in 1873. It is known from Taiwan and Japan.

References

zonata
Beetles described in 1873